Wandal  is a village in the southern state of Karnataka, India.

Overview
Wandal is a village and has population of approximately 8,000 (in the year 2011). People speak Kannada, Hindi and English languages fluently. 80% of the people in the village are educated. Each house in the village has at least one teacher or doctors or engineers are common in Wandal village. It is located in the Nidagundi taluk of Bijapur district in Karnataka. It was once recorded that village was having highest number of teachers in Bijapur district.

History
The village name came from banyan tree (in Kannada banyan tree means alada mara). In ancient days, people of the village used to gather under big banyan tree and have fun and other activities like village fest. So later, village name became Wandal (meaning one banyan tree).

Demographics

 India census, Wandal had a population of 6,730  with 2,882 males and 2,848 females. Wandal is in Nidagundi Taluka.

Culture

Includes genuine North Karnataka style art. Men wear dhothra, Nehru shirt and silk rumalu (Pakata). Women wear Ilkal saree and Khadi clothes in previous decades now it is all modern style brought it up from cities to village.

Cuisine
In the village, wheat and jowar rottis (unleavened bread made with millet) are popular.

The following are typical items in a vegetarian meal:

 Rotti/Bhakri, Rice, Saaru, Happala and Kosambari
 Shenga/Ellu  – Dry chutney in powder form, sometimes called ''Hindi (chutney)

Temples
The village has several temples

 Shree Banashankari Temple- The Village Goddess 
 Shree Durga Devi Temple
 Shree Mallikarjuna Temple
 Shree Basaveshwara Temple
 Shree Venkateswara Temple
 Shree Hanuman Temple
 Shree Beeralingeshwara Temple
 Shree Lakshmi Devi Temple

Education

In 2011, literacy rate of Wandal village is 75.36% of Karnataka. In Wandal, male literacy stands at 86.67% while female literacy rate was 63.76%.

College/schools near Wandal:
Shree Shakhambari High School 
KBHPS Wandal
Lower primary Urdu school
Bhagyavanti Lower Primary School

Transportation

Trains to  Wandal:
Golgumbaz Express
Basava Express
Dharwad -Solapur passenger

See also

 Almatti Dam
 Bijapur district
 Districts of Karnataka
 Kudalasangama
 Nidagundi

References

External links

https://www.studyapt.com/school-unaided-bhagyavanti-lps-wandal-bijapur-ka

Cities and towns in Bijapur district, Karnataka